Donald Laycock (1936–1988) was an Australian linguist and anthropologist. He is best remembered for his work on the languages of Papua New Guinea.

Biography
He was a graduate of University of Newcastle, New South Wales, Australia and later worked as a researcher at the University of Adelaide in Anthropology. He undertook his Ph.D. at the Australian National University in linguistics and became one among the leading authorities on the languages of Papua New Guinea.

He performed several pioneering surveys of the languages of the Sepik region of New Guinea. The first of these, his Ph.D. research under the supervision of Stephen Wurm, was published as The Ndu languages (1965), and established the existence of this closely related group of languages. In subsequent surveys, Laycock found the Ndu languages were part of a larger language family extending through the middle and upper Sepik valley (the "Sepik subphylum"), and in 1973 he proposed that these languages formed part of a Sepik–Ramu phylum. This remained the general consensus in the linguistic world for over 30 years. While more recent work by William A. Foley and Malcolm Ross has cast doubt on a link between the Ramu – Lower Sepik languages and the Sepik languages, the "Sepik subphylum" seems established as a genuine group.

Laycock also first identified the Torricelli (1968) and Piawi groups of languages. He published numerous papers in linguistics and anthropology.

He was described by his fellow authors of Skeptical (David Vernon, Dr. Colin Groves and Simon Brown) as a 20th-century 'Renaissance Man' as his interests were wide-ranging from Melanesian languages, to channelling, Tarot cards and bawdy songs.

He was a Fellow of the Australian Academy of the Humanities (FAHA), Vice President of the Australian Linguistic Society (ALS) and a member of Mensa. A keen member of the Australian Skeptics he entertained many people at Skeptic's conventions with his demonstrations of glossolalia and going into trances. After his death, Laycock's meticulous work on the Enochian 'language' (which was allegedly channelled to an associate of the Elizabethan mystic John Dee) was turned by a colleague into one of the very few classics of skeptical linguistics.

He died, after a short illness, in Canberra, on 27 December 1988.

See also
 Kwomtari–Baibai languages
 Papuan languages

Selected bibliography
 The Ndu language family (Sepik District, New Guinea). Pacific Linguistics C-1. Canberra: Pacific Linguistics, 1965. 
 "Languages of the Lumi subdistrict (West Sepik district), New Guinea." Oceanic Linguistics 7: 36–66. 1968.
 Sepik languages - checklist and preliminary classification. Pacific Linguistics B-25. Canberra, 1973. 
 (with John Z'graggen) "The Sepik–Ramu phylum." In: Stephen A. Wurm, ed. Papuan languages and the New Guinea linguistic scene: New Guinea area languages and language study 1. Pacific Linguistics C-38. 731–763. Canberra, 1975. 
 The Complete Enochian Dictionary: A Dictionary of the Angelic Language as Revealed to Dr. John Dee and Edward Kelley, London: Askin Publishers. 1978.
 The Best Bawdry, Angus & Robertson, Sydney, 1982.
 The World's Best Dirty Songs, Angus & Robertson, North Ryde, 1987, .
 (with Alice Buffet) Speak Norfuk Today, Norfolk Island, 1988.
  Skeptical Eds. Don Laycock, David Vernon, Colin Groves, Simon Brown, Canberra Skeptics, 1989, .
 A Dictionary of Buin, a language of Bougainville, ed. Masayuki Onishi (Pacific Linguistics 537, 2003). . (published posthumously)

References

 The Skeptic, Vol 19, No 1, p7
 The Second Coming, Barry Williams, Australian Skeptics, Sydney, 1990
 Aspects of meaning in fieldwork, in Tom Dutton, Malcolm Ross and Darrell Tryon (eds), The language game: Papers in memory of Don C. Laycock, Pacific Linguistics, C 110, 22 pp., Canberra: ANU, 1993

Australian anthropologists
Australian lexicographers
Linguists from Australia
Linguists of Papuan languages
1936 births
1988 deaths
Fellows of the Australian Academy of the Humanities
Australian National University alumni
Place of birth missing
Mensans
Paleolinguists
Linguists of Sepik languages
Linguists of Torricelli languages
Linguists of South Bougainville languages
Linguists of Norfuk
20th-century anthropologists
20th-century linguists
20th-century lexicographers
People from Canberra
University of Newcastle (Australia) alumni